Overpressure (or blast overpressure) is the pressure caused by a shock wave over and above normal atmospheric pressure.  The shock wave may be caused by sonic boom or by explosion, and the resulting overpressure receives particular attention when measuring the effects of nuclear weapons or thermobaric bombs.

Effects 

According to an article in the journal Toxicological Sciences,

Blast overpressure (BOP), also known as high energy impulse noise, is a damaging outcome of explosive detonations and firing of weapons. Exposure to BOP shock waves alone results in injury predominantly to the hollow organ systems such as auditory, respiratory, and gastrointestinal systems.

An EOD suit worn by bomb disposal experts can protect against the effects of BOP.

Calculation for an enclosed space 
Overpressure in an enclosed space is determined using "Weibull's formula":

where:
22.5 is a constant based on experimentation
 = (kilograms) net explosive mass calculated using all explosive materials and their relative effectiveness
 = (cubic meters) volume of given area (primarily used to determine volume within an enclosed space)

See also 
Bomb disposal

References 

Pressure
Explosives
Shock waves